Bhandari Militia was the first police establishment in Mumbai (then Bombay) during the time of British East India Company. In Bombay, Governor Aungier formed a militia of local Bhandari youth to deal with organized street-level gangs that robbed sailors in 1669. In those days the Bhandaris were referred as Bandareens.

See also
History of Bombay under British rule

References

History of Mumbai
Law enforcement agencies of India
History of law enforcement in India
Law enforcement in Maharashtra